Leo Seltzer (April 5, 1903 – January 30, 1978) was an American social-documentary filmmaker whose career spanned over half a century, having made more than sixty films.

One of the founders of the Workers' Film & Photo League, Seltzer received many international awards for his work, including an Academy Award for Best Documentary Short for First Steps. In 1962 he served as cinema-biographer to the White House for President John F. Kennedy.

Sources
Campbell, Russell. Cinema Strikes Back: Radical Filmmaking in the United States 1930–1942, Ann Arbor: UMI Research Press, 1982
Campbell, Russell.  Leo Seltzer interview: A total and realistic experience, Jump Cut, no. 14, 1977, pp. 25–27
Alexander, William.  Film on the Left: American Documentary Film From 1931 to 1942,  Princeton, N.J.: Princeton University Press, 1981
Seltzer, Leo. “Documenting the Depression of the 1930s: The Work of the Film and Photo League” in Platt, David, ed. Celluloid Power: Social Film Criticism from the “Birth of a Nation” to “Judgment at Nuremberg” Metuchen, NJ: Scarecrow Press: 1992,

References

1903 births
1978 deaths
American documentary filmmakers
American photojournalists
Social documentary photographers